Adelaide Chamber Singers is an Australian chamber choir. Along with Greta Bradman, Adelaide Symphony Orchestra and Luke Dollman they received a nomination for the 2018 ARIA Awards for Best Classical Album with the album Home.

Discography

Albums

Awards and nominations

ARIA Music Awards
The ARIA Music Awards are presented annually from 1987 by the Australian Recording Industry Association (ARIA). 

! 
|-
| 2018
| Home (with Adelaide Symphony Orchestra, Adelaide Chamber Singers & Luke Dollman)
| Best Classical Album
| 
|

References

External links
Adelaide Chamber Singers

Australian musical groups